Bion of Abdera (gen. Βίωνος) was a Greek mathematician of Abdera, Thrace, and a pupil of Democritus. He wrote both in the Ionic and Attic dialects, and was the first who said that there were some parts of the Earth in which it was night for six months, while the remaining six months were one uninterrupted day.

References

Sources

Ancient Greek mathematicians
Ancient Greek astronomers
Abderites
Ancient Thracian Greeks